Bill C-36 refers to various legislation introduced into the House of Commons of Canada, including:
 Anti-Terrorism Act, introduced in 2001 to the first session of the 37th Parliament
 ''Canada Consumer Product Safety Act, introduced in 2010 to the third session of the 40th Parliament
 Protection of Communities and Exploited Persons Act, introduced in 2014 to the second session of the 41st Parliament
 An Act to amend the Statistics Act, introduced in 2016 to the only session of the 42nd Parliament

Canadian federal legislation